Tambo District may refer to:

 Tambo District, Huaytará, Peru
 Tambo District, La Mar, Peru
 Tambo de Mora District, Chincha province, Peru
 Tambo Grande District, Piura province, Peru
 Río Tambo District, Satipo province, Peru